Oikawa Teruhisa (born 11 January 1936 as Kotsugu Oikawa) is a former sumo wrestler from Maesawa, Iwate, Japan. He made his professional debut in January 1952 and reached the top division in September 1957. His highest rank was maegashira 10. He retired from active competition in May 1962.

Pre-modern career record
In 1953 the New Year tournament was begun and the Spring tournament began to be held in Osaka.

Modern career record
Since the addition of the Kyushu tournament in 1957 and the Nagoya tournament in 1958, the yearly schedule has remained unchanged.

See also
Glossary of sumo terms
List of past sumo wrestlers
List of sumo tournament second division champions

References

1936 births
Living people
Japanese sumo wrestlers
Sumo people from Iwate Prefecture